Spanish Africa may refer to:

 Spanish North Africa (disambiguation)
 Contemporary Spanish North Africa, i.e. Spain's autonomous cities
 Ceuta, on the north coast of Africa
 Melilla, on the north coast of Africa
 Plazas de soberanía, sovereign territories scattered along the Mediterranean coast bordering Morocco
 Canary Islands, an archipelago off the coast of Morocco
 Spanish protectorate of Morocco (1912–1956)
 Spanish West Africa (1946–1958)
 Spanish Sahara (1884–1976), which included the provinces of Río de Oro and Saguia el-Hamra, now Moroccan-administered Western Sahara
 Cape Juby, on the coast of southern Morocco, part of the Spanish protectorate prior to 1958
 Ifni, on the coast of southern Morocco, part of Spain prior to 1969, now Moroccan province Sidi Ifni
 Spanish Guinea (1926–1968), now Equatorial Guinea
 Annobón, established 1778
 Fernando Pó, established 1778
 Río Muni, established 1778

See also
Ceuta and Melilla (disambiguation)
Canary Islands

Spanish Africa